Kissanga Kungo is a commune of Angola, located in the province of Cuanza Sul.

See also 

 Communes of Angola

References 

Cuanza Sul Province